Justice Davis may refer to:

Alton Davis (born c. 1946-47), associate justice of the Michigan Supreme Court
Charles Davis (Vermont judge), associate justice of the Vermont Supreme Court
Charles H. Davis (judge) (1906-1976), chief justice of the Illinois Supreme Court
David Davis (Supreme Court justice) (1815–1886), associate justice of the United States Supreme Court
Fred Henry Davis, associate justice of the Florida Supreme Court
Henry Hague Davis (1885–1944), puisne justice of the Supreme Court of Canada
Horace S. Davis (1892–1967), associate justice of the Montana Supreme Court
Joseph J. Davis (1828–1892), associate justice of the North Carolina Supreme Court
Michael K. Davis, associate justice of the Wyoming Supreme Court
Noah Davis, justice of the New York Supreme Court, and ex officio a judge of the New York Court of Appeals
Robert E. Davis (judge) (1939–2010), associate justice of the Kansas Supreme Court
Robert Grimes Davis, the Second associate justice of the Supreme Court of Hawaii, under the Kingdom of Hawaii
Robin Davis, associate justice of the Supreme Court of Appeals of West Virginia
Stephen B. Davis Jr., associate justice of the New Mexico Supreme Court
William Z. Davis, associate justice of the Ohio Supreme Court
Woodbury Davis, associate justice of the Maine Supreme Judicial Court

See also
Judge Davis (disambiguation)